Choy Yiu Chung (born 1 March 1961) is a Hong Kong former cyclist. He competed in the individual road race and the team time trial events at the 1984 Summer Olympics. He did not finish in the individual road race.

References

External links
 

1961 births
Living people
Hong Kong male cyclists
Olympic cyclists of Hong Kong
Cyclists at the 1984 Summer Olympics
Commonwealth Games competitors for Hong Kong
Cyclists at the 1986 Commonwealth Games
Place of birth missing (living people)